The Robert Award for Best Screenplay is one of the merit awards presented by the Danish Film Academy at the annual Robert Awards ceremony. The award has been handed out since 1984, but except in 1991 and 1993. On two occasions, in 2005 and in 2015, the Academy handed out two awards in the category, one for best original screenplay, and one for best adapted screenplay.

Lars von Trier is the most wins in this category with six.

Honorees

1980s 
 1984: Nils Malmros for Beauty and the Beast
 1985: Bjarne Reuter and Bille August for Twist and Shout
 1986:  for 
 1987:  for 
 1988: Bille August for Pelle the Conqueror
 1989: Søren Kragh-Jacobsen for

1990s 
 1990: Åke Sandgren and Stig Larsson for The Miracle in Valby
 1991: Not awarded
 1992:  for Freud's Leaving Home
 1993: Not awarded
 1994: Bille August for The House of the Spirits
 1996:  for 
 1997: Lars von Trier for Breaking the Waves
 1998:  for Eye of the Eagle
 1999: Thomas Vinterberg and Mogens Rukov for Festen

2000s 
 2000: Kim Fupz Aakeson for The One and Only
 Anders Thomas Jensen nominated for In China They Eat Dogs
 Anders Thomas Jensen and Søren Kragh-Jacobsen nominated for Mifunes sidste sang
 Ole Christian Madsen,  and Lars Andersen nominated for 
  and  nominated for Bornholms stemme
  and Dennis Jürgensen nominated for Love at First Hiccough
 2001: Lone Scherfig for Italian for Beginners
 Kim Leona and Per Fly nominated for Bænken
 Anders Thomas Jensen nominated for Flickering Lights
  and Karsten Kiilerich nominated for Help! I'm a Fish
 Kim Fupz Aakeson nominated for 
 2002: Ole Christian Madsen and Mogens Rukov for Kira's Reason: A Love Story
 Anders Thomas Jensen nominated for 
 2003: Nils Malmros and John Mogensen for At kende sandheden
 Kim Fupz Aakeson nominated for Okay
 Yüksel Isik nominated for 
 Anders Thomas Jensen nominated for Old Men in New Cars
 Nikolaj Arcel nominated for Klatretøsen
 2004: Lars von Trier for Dogville
 Per Fly, Kim Leona, Mogens Rukov and  nominated for Arven
 Anders Thomas Jensen nominated for The Green Butchers
 Kim Leona nominated for 
  nominated for 
 2005: Anders Thomas Jensen for Brødre (Best original screenplay) & Nikolaj Arcel & Rasmus Heisterberg for King's Game (Best adapted screenplay)
 Simon Staho and  nominated for Dag och natt
 Kim Fupz Aakeson and Annette K. Olesen nominated for In Your Hands
 Kim Fupz Aakeson nominated for Lad de små børn...
 Nicolas Winding Refn nominated for Pusher II
 2006: Anders Thomas Jensen for Adam's Apples
 Per Fly, Kim Leona, Mogens Rukov and  nominated for Drabet
 Åke Sandgren nominated for 
 Lars von Trier nominated for Manderlay
 Dagur Kári and Rune Schjøtt nominated for Voksne mennesker
 2007: Niels Arden Oplev and Steen Bille for Drømmen
 Lars von Trier nominated for The Boss of It All
 Anders Thomas Jensen nominated for Efter brylluppet
 Kim Fupz Aakeson nominated for 
 Kim Fupz Aakeson and Pernille Fischer Christensen nominated for A Soap
 Christoffer Boe and  nominated for Offscreen
 2008:  for The Art of Crying
  and Anders Morgenthaler nominated for Echo
  and Simon Staho nominated for Daisy Diamond
 Ole Bornedal nominated for Just Another Love Story
 Anders Thomas Jensen and Jannik Johansen nominated for 
 2009:  and Henrik Ruben Genz for Terribly Happy
 Kristian Levring and Anders Thomas Jensen nominated for Fear Me Not
 Rasmus Heisterberg and Nikolaj Arcel nominated for Journey to Saturn
 Lars Andersen and Ole Christian Madsen nominated for Flammen og Citronen
 Niels Arden Oplev and Steen Bille nominated for To verdener

2010s 
 2010: Lars von Trier for Antichrist
 Ole Bornedal nominated for Deliver Us from Evil
 Rumle Hammerich nominated for Headhunter
 Nils Malmros and John Mogensen nominated for 
  nominated for Oldboys
 2011: Tobias Lindholm and Michael Noer for R
 Tobias Lindholm and Thomas Vinterberg nominated for Submarino
 Anders Thomas Jensen nominated for In a Better World
 Nikolaj Arcel and Rasmus Heisterberg nominated for Truth About Men
 Nicolas Winding Refn and Roy Jacobsen nominated for Valhalla Rising
 2012: Lars von Trier for Melancholia
 Kim Fupz Aakeson and Pernille Fischer Christensen nominated for A Family
 Anders August and Martin Zandvliet nominated for A Funny Man
 Morten Kirkskov, Carlos Augusto de Oliveira and Jens Dahl nominated for Rosa Morena
 Ole Christian Madsen and Anders August nominated for SuperClásico
 2013: Tobias Lindholm for A Hijacking
 Anders Thomas Jensen nominated for Love Is All You Need
 ,  and David Sandreuter nominated for 
  and  nominated for 
 Nikolaj Arcel and Rasmus Heisterberg nominated for A Royal Affair
 2014: Thomas Vinterberg and Tobias Lindholm for The Hunt
 Nikolaj Arcel nominated for Kvinden i buret
 Rasmus Heisterberg and Michael Noer nominated for Nordvest
 Nils Malmros and John Mogensen nominated for Sorg og glæde
 Simon Pasternak and Christoffer Boe nominated for 
  nominated for Stille hjerte
 Kim Fupz Aakeson and Pernille Fischer Christensen nominated for En du elsker
  nominated for All Inclusive
 Rasmus Birch nominated for When Animals Dream
 2016: Martin Zandvliet – Land of Mine
 Anders August and Kasper Barfoed nominated for Sommeren '92
 Anders Thomas Jensen nominated for Men & Chicken
 Maren Louise Käehne and May el-Toukhy nominated for 
 Tobias Lindholm nominated for Krigen
 2017:  for Der kommer en dag
 Rasmus Heisterberg nominated for In the Blood
 Christian Tafdrup nominated for Parents
 Ali Abbasi and Maren Louise Käehne nominated for Shelley
 Nicolas Winding Refn, Mary Laws, Polly Stenham nominated for The Neon Demon
 2018: Christian Tafdrup and Mads Tafdrup for En frygtelig kvinde
 Fenar Ahmad and  nominated for Underverden
  nominated for 
  nominated for 
 Hlynur Pálmason nominated for Vinterbrødre
 2019: Gustav Möller and Emil Nygaard Albertsen for The Guilty
 Jakob Weis nominated for That Time of Year
 Ditte Hansen and Louise Mieritz nominated for 
  and Isabella Eklöf nominated for Holiday
 Lars von Trier nominated for The House That Jack Built

2020s 
 2020: Maren Louise Käehne and May el-Toukhy for Dronningen
  nominated for 
 Jesper Fink, Michael Noer nominated for Før frosten
 Marie Grahtø Sørensen nominated for 
  nominated for 
 2021: Thomas Vinterberg and Tobias Lindholm for Druk
 Anders Thomas Jensen nominated for Riders of Justice
  and  nominated for Shorta
  nominated for 
  nominated for A Perfectly Normal Family

See also 

 Bodil Award for Best Screenplay

References

External links 
  

1984 establishments in Denmark
Awards established in 1984
Screenwriting awards for film
Screenplay